Tyrone Hopson (born May 28, 1976 in Hopkinsville, Kentucky) is an American football offensive guard who played in the National Football League. He graduated from Daviess County High School in Owensboro, Kentucky. He played college football for the Eastern Kentucky University and was drafted in the fifth round of the 1999 NFL Draft by the San Francisco 49ers.

References

1976 births
Living people
American football offensive linemen
Eastern Kentucky Colonels football players
San Francisco 49ers players
Jacksonville Jaguars players
Detroit Lions players